Orlando Enrique Costas (15 June 1942 — 5 November 1987) was a Hispanic Evangelical theologian and missiologist.

Biography 
Costas was born in Ponce, Puerto Rico to Methodist parents, Ventura Enrique Costas and Rosaline Rivera. He moved with his father to the United States, living first in the Bronx then Bridgeport, CT. He finished his high school years at Bob Jones Academy and studied at the Missionary College of Nyack. Costas returned to Puerto Rico, where he was ordained in the American Baptist Churches of Puerto Rico, pastored a local church, and studied at the Interamerican University. He returned to the United States in 1966, where he pastored and studied at Trinity Evangelical Divinity School, Wheaton College, and completed a master's degree at Winona Lake School of Theology, and, in 1969, completed an M.Div. at the Garrett–Evangelical Theological Seminary. In 1976, he completed his Th.D. at the Free University of Amsterdam, writing on "Theology of the Crossroads in Contemporary Latin America: Missiology in Mainline Protestantism, 1969-1974" under Johannes Verkuyl. He later taught at Eastern Baptist Theological Seminary and Andover Newton Theological School.

Costas became a major figure in the Latin American Theological Fellowship and the Lausanne movement, advocating for a holistic mission which brought together evangelism with social activism.

Costas married Rosa Lydia Feliciano in December 1962, and they had two daughters, Annette (born 1963) and Dannette (born 1967). He died of stomach cancer in his home in Newton Centre, MA.

Works

References 

1942 births
1987 deaths
Vrije Universiteit Amsterdam alumni
Christian socialist theologians
World Christianity scholars